The Nursing & Health Care School, University of Glasgow, (formerly the Division of Nursing and Health Care) is a speciality area within the School of Medicine, Dentistry and Nursing in Glasgow, Scotland. The School has offered a degree course in Nursing since 1977, introduced under the Dean of the Faculty of Medicine at the time, Professor Edward McGirr.

History 
University of Glasgow students contributed to nursing long before the Nursing & Health Care School opened. In 1915, it was announced that student volunteers could help at the Military Royal Army Medical Corps (RAMC). The Western and the Glasgow Royal Infirmary hospitals accepted volunteers as nurses though students could also volunteer at hospitals overseas. Many female students signed up and received training to work as nurses including both those who were undertaking medical training at Glasgow as well as those who were not pursuing a career in medicine. One such Glasgow alumna was Isabel MacPhail: when war broke in 1914, she and her sister Katherine went to Serbia to work in the Scottish Women’s Hospital. MacPhail was awarded a number of decorations for her service: the French Medaille d’Honneur, the Serbian Cross of Charity and the Serbian Red Cross Nursing Medal.

The Nursing & Health Care School was established by Professor Edward McGirr. He was Professor of Medicine from 1961 to 1978 and Dean of the Faculty of Medicine from 1974 to 1981. The School offered a four year undergraduate pre-registration Bachelor of Nursing degree programme, which was to admit up to 25 students to the course which would lead to the award of the Bachelor of Nursing degree. The course would combine academic study and professional training. The choice of locating the Nursing degree programme within the Medical Faculty was deliberate with the intention to produce graduate nurses who would be thoroughly grounded in health-related scientific theory and be competent and safe practitioners.

In the first 30 years of the Nursing & Health Care School, 214 nurses had graduated from the programme. As of 2023, between 50 and 60 students start their Bachelor of Nursing (Hons) degree programme each year in Glasgow.

In 2011, the University of Glasgow proposed closing the Nursing & Health Care School as part of a University wide cost cutting exercise. A petition received over 900 signatories and the Royal College of Nursing spoke in favour of keeping the School open.

In 2016 the School of Nursing & Health Care and Singapore Institute of Technology developed a joint Bachelor of Science with Honours in Nursing. This two-year post-registration nursing degree programme was co-created and designed with inputs from practice partners and the Ministry of Health in Singapore, and accredited by the Singapore Nursing Board. This degree programme builds on the foundation that students have established during their nursing diploma studies. The aim of the programme is to develop critical, analytical and innovation skills, as well as leadership, research, teaching, and clinical competencies.

Programmes 
The Nursing & Health Care School runs both undergraduate and postgraduate programmes.

Associated hospitals 

 Queen Elizabeth University Hospital
 Glasgow Royal Infirmary
 Golden Jubilee University National Hospital

Notable alumni, academics and staff

Professors of Nursing 

 Professor Agnes Jarvis,  Professor of Nursing Studies.
 Professor Lorraine N. Smith was appointed Professor of Nursing Studies in 1990. She remained as Professor Emerita after her retirement from 2012.
 Professor Bridget Johnston is Clinical Professor of Nursing and Palliative Care, Director of Research School of Medicine, Dentistry & Nursing, College of Medical, Veterinary & Life Sciences, University of Glasgow and Chief Nurse Research, NHS Greater Glasgow & Clyde. Professor Johnston was named as a Fellow of the Royal College of Nursing in May 2019 in recognition of her research work in palliative and end of life care.
 Professor Eileen Cowey - Professor of Nursing Studies and Head of School (2021 onwards).

Heads of School 

 1983 - 1988 Professor Agnes Jarvis                  
 1989 - 1990 Professor Hamish Barber              
 1990 – 2001 Professor Lorraine N. Smith           
 2001 - 2003 Nora Kearney                                 
 2003 - 2007 Dr Joan McDowell                          
 2007 - 2016 Margaret Sneddon                          
 2016 - 2020 Professor Ann Marie Rice              
 2020 - 2021 Dr Doreen Molloy                            
 2021 – present Professor Eileen Cowey

Other notable staff 

 Olivia Brittian MCC RN RM ONC HV CPT, joined the University of Glasgow in 1987. She worked as the Director of Undergraduate Programme in the Nursing and Health Care School, Ms Brittian originally trained in the Victoria Infirmary in 1963 and worked as a Midwifery sister in Nigeria and as a Health Visitor in Glasgow.
 Honorary Professor Christine Moffatt CBE  was a Visiting Chair at the University of Glasgow in 2008. She received the accolade of the Nursing Times Diamond 20 award, which recognises the 20 most influential nurses of the last 60 years, who have changed the face of the profession from the inception of the National Health Service, and made a significant contribution to health care. The award was in recognition of Christine's transformation of leg-ulcer management and her contribution to wound care and lymphoedema management.
 Rev. David Mitchell, the Programme Leader for Healthcare Chaplaincy in Nursing & Health Care wrote Spiritual Care for Healthcare‌ Professionals with colleagues Ewan Kelly, Programme Director Spiritual Care and Healthcare Chaplaincy NHS Education for Scotland; and Tom Gordon, Chair of the Chaplaincy Training Advisory Group, Scotland. This book won the British Medical Association Book Award, 2012. 
 Robin Downie, Emeritus Professor of Moral Philosophy and an Honorary Professorial Research Fellow in the Department of Philosophy.
 Margaret Sneddon, Lymphoedema Care Nurse of the Year, 2014.

Notable alumni 

 Alison Bunce, RCN Nurse of the Year 2022

Annual McGirr Public Lecture 
A lecture is held annually to commemorate Professor McGirr and the establishment of Nursing at Glasgow. The McGirr Prize is awarded to the most distinguished graduate of the year in the Bachelor of Nursing Degree. The Annual McGirr Lecture was established in 2003. Guest speakers have included:

 2007 – Olivia Giles, founder of 500 miles charity
 2008 – Justine Whittaker, Nurse of the Year 2007
 2009 – Jason Leitch, National Clinical Lead for Patient Safety and Improvement at the Scottish Government.
 2010 – Lynn Murray, Co-founder ‘Think Pink Scotland' raising funds for breast cancer research
 2011 – Ros Moore, Chief Nursing Officer, The Scottish Government
 2012 - Mary Waddell, OBE, retired Director of Nursing, Eastern Board, Northern Ireland
 2013 - Cathy van Beek - Patient Partnership; a Challenge 4 Change
 2014 – Emma Cartwright, a young person with diabetes
 2015 – Ona Croft, Shift Leader, Kerrytown Ebola Virus Disease Treatment Unit (EVDTU), Sierra Leone
 2016 - Dr Christine Goodall, founder Medics against Violence charity in collaboration with the Scottish Violence Reduction Unit
 2017 – Professor Brendan McCormack, internationally recognised for work in person-centred practice development and research
 2018 – Fiona McQueen, Chief Nursing Officer, The Scottish Government
 2019 – Sarah Everett – Men’s Shed Govan and Patient’s Choice Award Winner at RCNI Nurse Awards 
 2020 – did not take place due to pandemic
 2021 – Professor Alex McMahon, Chief Nursing Officer, The Scottish Government
 2022 - Professor Calvin Moorley, Professor Diversity & Social Justice

University of Glasgow Nursing Society 
The University of Glasgow has a Nursing Society run by nursing students.

Ranking 
In 2023, the Bachelor of Nursing (Honours) programme at The University of Glasgow was ranked 1st in the UK in the Complete University Guide, 2nd in the UK in The Times and Sunday Times Good University Guide and 3rd in the UK for Nursing & Midwifery in the Guardian University Guide.

External links 
 School of Nursing and Health Care

References 

Schools of the University of Glasgow
Nursing education in the United Kingdom
NHS Scotland